Schömberg is a town in the Zollernalbkreis district of Baden-Württemberg, Germany.

History
In the 1950s and 1960s, Schömberg enjoyed a period of growth to the south, east, and west. The  merged the district of Balingen into the newly created Zollernalb district in January. The next month, on 1 February, Schömberg and Schörzingen merged into a single municipality. There was further urban growth in the 1980s, when a gap between some industrial parks to the south was closed with the construction of additional commercial zones.

Geography
The township (Stadt) of Schömberg is located in Zollernalbkreis, a district of the German state of Baden-Württemberg. The main watercourse in the municipal area is the Schlichem, whose deeply-cut valley forms part of the northern municipal border. The Schlichem is also the location of the lowest elevation above sea level in Schömberg at  Normalnull (NN). The highest elevation,  NN, is found at the top of the Plettenberg, in the east.

The Federally-protected  and  nature reserves are partially located within Schömberg's municipal area.

Coat of arms
Schömberg's municipal coat of arms is divided party per fess into two halves, the bottom red and the top white. Inside the white field is a black stag's antler. The pattern refers in to firstly the County of Hohenberg, whose white-red coat of arms appeared on municipal seal as early as 1278, and to Württemberg, whose own coat of arms prominently features stag horns. The addition of the stag horn also distinguished Schömberg's arms from those of other former Hohenberger towns (Haigerloch, Horb am Neckar, and Rottenburg am Neckar). This pattern was in use by Schömberg before the 1973 merger with Schörzingen and was reapproved by the Zollernalb district office on 1 October 1976.

Transportation

Railway

On the he Tübingen–Sigmaringen railway and the  Balingen–Rottweil railway a tourism Train of the SWEG Südwestdeutsche Landesverkehrs-AG .
The  railway was reactivated for excursion trips of the Rad-Wander(Bike Hiking)-Shuttle, running from May to October, supporting cycling tourism to Schömberg Stausee(Schömberger Reservoir).
Bathing, sunbathing, eating, going for a walk, boating and relaxing - these are just a few of the many things you can spend a good time with at the Schömberger Reservoir.

Notable people
 Margareta Weißbrot, accused witch burned at the stake in 1554.
 Anna Klarer, accused witch burned at the stake in 1607.

References

External links
  (in German)

Württemberg